Huang Geng (born 10 July 1970) is a retired male long jumper from PR China. His personal best is 8.38 metres, achieved in May 1995 in Taiyuan.

Achievements

References

1970 births
Living people
Chinese male long jumpers
Athletes (track and field) at the 1992 Summer Olympics
Athletes (track and field) at the 1996 Summer Olympics
Olympic athletes of China
Asian Games medalists in athletics (track and field)
Athletes (track and field) at the 1990 Asian Games
Athletes (track and field) at the 1994 Asian Games
Asian Games gold medalists for China
Asian Games silver medalists for China
Medalists at the 1990 Asian Games
Medalists at the 1994 Asian Games
20th-century Chinese people